Seymour Halpern (November 19, 1913 – January 10, 1997) was an American politician from New York.

Life
He was born in New York City. He graduated from Richmond Hill High School and attended Seth Low College of Columbia University from 1932 to 1934. He worked as a newspaper reporter in New York and Chicago from 1931 to 1933 and also engaged in the insurance business.

Halpern was a staff assistant to Mayor Fiorello La Guardia in 1937; and an assistant to the President of the New York City Council from 1938 to 1940.

He was a member of the New York State Senate from 1941 to 1954, sitting in the 163rd, 164th, 165th, 166th, 167th, 168th and 169th New York State Legislatures. He also served as a member of the Temporary State Commission to Revise the Civil Service Laws from 1952 to 1954. He was an unsuccessful Republican candidate for election to the 84th Congress in 1954.

He was a member of Mayor's Committee on Courts from 1956 to 1958. He also served as vice president and later chairman of the board of the Insurist Corporation of America from 1948 to 1959.

He was elected as a Republican to the 86th, 87th, 88th, 89th, 90th, 91st and 92nd United States Congresses, holding office from January 3, 1959, to January 3, 1973. According to the 1972 edition of The Almanac of American Politics, Halpern was "one of the most liberal Republicans in the House." When Halpern's district was combined with that of Representative Lester Wolff he chose not to run for re-election in 1972. He later worked in public relations.

He died in Southampton on January 10, 1997, aged 83.  Halpern was buried at Mount Lebanon Cemetery in the Glendale section of Queens.

See also

 List of Jewish members of the United States Congress

References

External links
 
 

1913 births
1997 deaths
Columbia University School of General Studies alumni
Jewish members of the United States House of Representatives
Republican Party New York (state) state senators
People from Queens, New York
Republican Party members of the United States House of Representatives from New York (state)
Burials in New York (state)
20th-century American politicians
20th-century American Jews